The European 10,000m Cup is an annual 10,000 metres race for European athletes which was first held in 1997. The competition is organised by the European Athletics Association and first began as the European 10000 Metres Challenge (European 10,000m Challenge till 2005 edition),
after the event was removed from the European Cup programme. The competition has roots in the Iberian 10,000 metres Championships – a competition between Spanish and Portuguese athletes that was held between 1991 and 1996 – and the first five editions of the European 10000 Metres Challenge were held in the Iberian Peninsula. The event was first held under its current title in 2005. From 2018, the event has been held as the climax of the Night of 10k PB's event at Parliament Hill, London.

Editions

Champions

Records 
The competition record for men is 27:14.44, set in 1998 by Fabián Roncero from Spain.
The competition record for women is 30:21.67, set in 2006 by Elvan Abeylegesse from Turkey.

Medal table (1997-2022)

References

External links
Official website
European Athletics Statistics – European Cup 10,000m (1997-2008)
Competition History (2008-2018)

 
Cup 10,000m
Recurring sporting events established in 1997
Athletics team events